David Scott (born 8 June 1993) is a Scottish professional rugby league footballer who last played as a  or er for the Midlands Hurricanes in the Betfred League 1, and Scotland at international level. He has recently become a science teacher.

He has previously spent time with Featherstone Rovers and played for Doncaster in the Championship.

Background
Scott was born in Stirling, Scotland.

Club career
Scott started playing rugby at the age of seven for his local rugby union club. Scott was first introduced to rugby league when he watched it on television, and began playing the sport from the age of 12 for Easterhouse Panthers. He was scouted by English Super League side Hull Kingston Rovers, who signed him in 2011.

Featherstone Rovers
He spent two years playing for Hull KR's academy before joining Featherstone Rovers ahead of the 2013 season.

Doncaster
He was loaned out to Doncaster, and joined the club on a permanent deal for the 2014 season.

Coventry Bears
On 4 Sep 2020 it was announced that Scott would join Coventry Bears as a player/coach

Representative career
At the age of 18, Scott made his senior début for Scotland in 2011, scoring two tries and two goals in a 26–6 victory over Ireland.

In 2013, Scott was selected in Scotland's 2013 Rugby League World Cup squad. He was one of two Scottish-born players to be included in the squad (the other being Matty Russell), and is the only player to have also been raised in Scotland.

In October and November 2014, David played in the 2014 European Cup. He scored two tries in the tournament's opening game against Wales.

In October and November 2015, David played for Scotland in the 2015 European Cup.

References

External links

(archived by web.archive.org) Statistics at rlwc2017.com

1993 births
Living people
Batley Bulldogs players
Coventry Bears players
Doncaster R.L.F.C. players
Rugby league fullbacks
Rugby league players from Stirling
Rugby union players from Stirling
Scottish rugby union players
Scottish rugby league players
Scotland national rugby league team players